Robert Chien, or Chien Chun (February 8, 1929 – March 2, 2014), was a Taiwanese economist and a politician. Chien graduated from the National Taiwan University with a bachelor's degree in economics and later on earned a master's degree from the University of Minnesota. He was the Deputy Governor of the Central Bank of the Republic of China (1974–1985), Minister of Finance (1985-1988), and the Secretary-General of the Executive Yuan (1988-1989).

Family
His father Chien Shih-Liang, a chemist, was former President of Academia Sinica. His younger brother Shu Chien is a biologist and engineer, and youngest brother Fredrick Chien is an influential politician in Taiwan who served as the President of Control Yuan and Minister of Foreign Affairs.

References

1929 births
2014 deaths
National Taiwan University alumni
University of Minnesota alumni
Taiwanese Ministers of Finance